Chayamurti is a Bengali horror film directed by Jeet Chatterjee and produced by Soma Das. The film was released on 6 March 2020 under the banner of Rajdeep Films and Productions.

Plot
Monika a young girl joined in a job in a doctor's chamber. She faced some mysterious and horrible incident there and informs her boyfriend about it. He ignores, considering this is her hallucination. Finally Monika died, but after her unnatural death her vengeful spirit revives.

Cast
 Abhishek Chatterjee as Doctor
 Sumana Das
 Sabyasachi Chowdhury
 Soma Das
 Subhayan Roy
 Subholina

References

2020 films
Bengali-language Indian films
2020s Bengali-language films
Indian horror films
2020 horror films